Chester is a city in Howard County, Iowa, United States. The population was 139 in the 2020 census, a decrease of 7.9% from the 151 population in the 2000 census. Chester is located close to the state line from Minnesota.

History
Chester was laid out in 1858.

Geography
Chester is located at  (43.491126, -92.361196).

Demographics

2010 census
As of the census of 2010, there were 127 people, 64 households, and 36 families residing in the city. The racial makeup of the city was 99.2% White and 0.8% Native American. Hispanic or Latino of any race were 0.8% of the population.

There were 64 households, of which 17.2% had children under the age of 18 living with them, 42.2% were married couples living together, 4.7% had a female householder with no husband present, 9.4% had a male householder with no wife present, and 43.8% were non-families. 40.6% of all households were made up of individuals, and 21.8% had someone living alone who was 65 years of age or older. The average household size was 1.98 and the average family size was 2.58.

The median age in the city was 48.8 years. 17.3% of residents were under the age of 18; 5.5% were between the ages of 18 and 24; 20.5% were from 25 to 44; 27.5% were from 45 to 64; and 29.1% were 65 years of age or older. The gender makeup of the city was 55.1% male and 44.9% female.

2000 census
As of the census of 2000, there were 151 people, 71 households, and 47 families residing in the city. The racial makeup of the city was 99.34% White, 0.66% from other races. Hispanic or Latino of any race were 1.32% of the population.

There were 71 households, out of which 22.5% had children under the age of 18 living with them, 56.3% were married couples living together, 8.5% had a female householder with no husband present, and 33.8% were non-families. 31.0% of all households were made up of individuals, and 21.1% had someone living alone who was 65 years of age or older. The average household size was 2.13 and the average family size was 2.64.

In the city, the population was spread out, with 19.2% under the age of 18, 5.3% from 18 to 24, 22.5% from 25 to 44, 24.5% from 45 to 64, and 28.5% who were 65 years of age or older. The median age was 48 years. For every 100 females, there were 81.9 males. For every 100 females age 18 and over, there were 71.8 males.

The median income for a household in the city was $21,875, and the median income for a family was $40,625. Males had a median income of $28,438 versus $21,667 for females. The per capita income for the city was $18,240. There were 4.7% of families and 8.2% of the population living below the poverty line, including 22.2% of under eighteens and none of those over 64.

Education
Howard–Winneshiek Community School District operates public schools. The district was formed from the merger of the Cresco, Lime Springs/Chester, Elma, and Ridgeway school districts, opening on July 1, 1960.

In 2015 the district board voted to close the Lime Springs–Chester Elementary School on a 4–1 basis.

References

External links

 

Cities in Iowa
Cities in Howard County, Iowa